Detroit Opera is the principal opera company in Michigan, USA. The company is based in Detroit, where it performs in the Detroit Opera House. Prior to February 28, 2022, the company was named Michigan Opera Theatre.

Each year it presents an opera and dance season. The company presents four operas in their original language with English supertitles and hosts dance companies with touring repertoire. It also presents musical theatre performances. The company has an orchestra, chorus, children's chorus, and extensive dance and arts education outreach programs. In 2005 MOT won a National Endowment for the Arts, Access to Artistic Excellence grant to support its staging of the world premiere of Margaret Garner.

History
Detroit Opera began as the educational outreach arm, Overture to Opera (OTO), of the Detroit Grand Opera Association, the organization responsible for the Metropolitan Opera's visits to Detroit. In 1963, Michigan Opera Theatre's (MOT) Founder and General Director, David DiChiera took over the program, then in its third year. OTO first presented opera to the public as a collection of scenes and acts. It did not produce its first full-length production until 1970, with the staging of The Barber of Seville at the Detroit Institute of Arts. Overture to Opera officially became Michigan Opera Theatre in 1971 after it established a board of trustees, signifying its transformation into a professional opera company. 1977 marked the founding of MOT's Department of Community Programs by Karen VanderKloot DiChiera. The company became known for it casting which often featured a blend of established artists as well as young-up-and-coming American opera singers from a diversity of backgrounds, a tradition that continues to this day. The company was among the first to stage Gershwin's opera Porgy and Bess in 1975 as well as Scott Joplin's opera Treemonisha in 1983. In 2005 the company staged the world premiere of Richard Danielpour's Margaret Garner, based on Toni Morrison's novel Beloved. MOT also established an international reputation for the staging of rarely performed operas such as the North American premiere of Armenian composer, Armen Tigranian's, Anoush in 1981, Polish composer, Karol Szymanowski's King Roger in 1991, and the American premiere of Stanisław Moniuszko's The Haunted Castle in 1982. In 1989 the decision was made to purchase MOT's current home, the Detroit Opera House Originally called the Capital Theatre, the building, designed by C. Howard Crane, was in need of extensive restoration. The company eventually gained enough money to purchase the entire block encompassing the neighboring Roberts Fur building, which the company demolished in 1993 to make way for the  stage house. The monumental task which became known as "The Detroit Opera House Project" took approximately 7 years to complete and was supported by local individuals, corporations, foundations and unions. Luciano Pavarotti was also a major contributor to the campaign, bringing the attention of the public to the project at large by promising to sing at the opening of the new opera house, donating large amounts of money to the cause, and by making various appearances around Detroit in performances designed to raise money for the project. In April 1996, MOT celebrated the opening of its new home with a Gala event which received international coverage. Among the guests at the Gala were opera stars Joan Sutherland, Luciano Pavarotti, Irina Mishura, Helen Donath, Marcello Giordani, Gregg Baker, Alessandra Marc, and Elizabeth Parcells, conductor Steven Mercurio, and actor Roddy McDowall. The evening also featured a Fanfare for the Detroit Opera House by American composer William Bolcom which had been especially commissioned for the Gala.  In 1996 MOT also added a permanent dance season to its repertoire with performances by the American Ballet Theatre and the Cleveland San Jose Ballet.

On February 28, 2022, Michigan Opera Theatre changed its name to Detroit Opera.

Venues
Several of Detroit's performing arts venues have been home to Michigan Opera Theatre. With the move to the Music Hall Center in 1971. Detroit Opera is credited with helping to regenerate Detroit's Entertainment District. Still operating as Overture to Opera the company saved the Music Hall from demolition in 1971 and staged its first season there with productions of Joseph and the Amazing Technicolor Dreamcoat and Puccini's La rondine. Besides the Music Hall,  Detroit Opera has staged productions at the Detroit Masonic Temple Theatre, and the Fisher Theatre. In the 1984 spring season the company moved to the Masonic Temple to accommodate larger audiences and bigger productions. Its first production at the Masonic Temple was Anna Bolena, starring Joan Sutherland. The production also featured the American Midwest premiere of English surtitles. In 1985 the company moved to The Fisher Theatre for its autumn season and staged West Side Storywhich received an extended run and became one of Michigan Opera Theatres top grossing productions.

Arts education and outreach 
Detroit Opera's Department of Community Programs was founded by Karen Vanderkloot DiChiera in 1977. Since then, it has established The Joyce H. Cohn Apprentice Award Fund to support MOT's Young Artist Apprentice Program. It has also been awarded the Success in Education Award by Opera America. MOT's Arts Education and Outreach program, which is a division of MOT's Department of Community programs works with students in local schools. The department also host Learning at the Opera House which offers classes, and workshops for children and adults during the summer months. The department also offers touring programs to local schools, churches and community groups. Detroit Opera's Department of Community programs has also premiered many operas. They include Vigilance, Pete, The Pirate, and Nanabush which were composed by Karen V. DiChiera and Summer Snow which was composed by Fred Rogers of Mister Rogers' Neighborhood.

The Margo V. Cohen Center for Dance
The Margo V. Cohen Center for Dance was founded in 2001 and was run by Dr. Carol Halsted as Director of Dance. The department which is also a component of Detroit Opera's community outreach programming hosts the company's Dance Film series and the American Ballet Theatre summer intensive program. The center also hosts year-round dance classes for beginning to advanced dance students. Dance auditions are also held at the center.

The Allesee Dance and Opera Resource Library 
The Allesee Dance and Opera Resource Library is the official library and archive for Detroit Opera. It specializes in research materials specific to dance, opera and MOT's 40-year history. The library was made possible in 2006 with a gift from Robert and Maggie Allesee. The library and archive center carries books, scores, CDs, videos and hundreds of unique items such as photos and performance reviews from MOT's productions. The Allesee Dance and Opera Resource Library's catalogue was recently made available for the public to access online through a unique partnership with Wayne State University's School of Library and Information Science.

Notable productions
Outside of the standard repertoire, notable productions have included:

Opera/Musicals
1979: MOT's production of The Most Happy Fella which traveled to Broadway and received rave reviews
1984: Donizetti's Anna Bolena featuring Australian soprano Dame Joan Sutherland. This was the first appearance in the Midwest of surtitle translations
1988: Puccini's La Boheme featured Russian tenor Vyacheslav Polozov's.
1999: Massenet's Werther featured Italian tenor Andrea Bocelli's North American opera debut, with American mezzo Denyce Graves. The production was webcast.
2003: Luciano Pavarotti appeared in his last Michigan performance at the Palace of Auburn Hills
2005: Grammy Award winner Richard Danielpour's Margaret Garner world premiere, from a libretto by Nobel Prize winning author Toni Morrison
2007: MOT's general director Dr. David DiChiera's Cyrano in its world premiere. The libretto was by Bernard Uzan.

Dance
1989–90 Season: Swan Lake performed by Cleveland Ballet; this was the first time dance appeared in the season.
 1991-92: MOT produces its first ballet, choreography by Iacob Lascu
 1996: American Ballet Theatre and Cleveland San Jose Ballet, MOT's first dance session
 1998: Alvin Ailey MOT debut
 1999: Paul Taylor Dance Company MOT debut
2001: Joffrey Ballet MOT debut
2002: Ballet Internationale The Nutcracker the beginning of a tradition
2002–2003: Bolshoi Ballet
 2003: Dance Theatre of Harlem
 2003: Les Ballets Africains
2004: The Kirov Ballet
 2004: North Carolina Dance Theatre A Streetcar Named Desire
 2005–2006: Savion Glover
 2007: The Grand Rapids Ballet Where The Wild Things Are

Notable artists
Among the notable artists who have sung at MOT early in their careers are: Detroit-born Maria Ewing who sang in the 1970 The Barber of Seville production; Leona Mitchell, who sang Bess in the company's 1975 production of Porgy and Bess; Kathleen Battle, whose 1975 performance as Rosina in The Barber of Seville marked her operatic debut; Catherine Malfitano, who created the role of Catherine Sloper in MOT's world premiere staging of Washington Square in 1976. Other notable artists include The Metropolitan Opera's Jerome Hines, a bass, who in 1974 sang the title role of Boris Godunov; Nicole Cabell who sang Musetta in La bohème in 2005, a few months after winning the BBC Cardiff Singer of the World competition; Australian soprano Dame Joan Sutherland who sang the title role in Donizetti's Anna Bolena; Martina Arroyo and Ghena Dimitrova who sang in MOT's 1986 production of Turandot; Luciano Pavarotti who sang at Joe Louis Arena in 1989; Irina Mishura who played Carmen during the 1996-97 season; The Three Tenors in 1999 at the historic Tiger Stadium in Detroit, Andrea Bocelli who made his staged operatic debut in Werther and Denyce Graves who made her MOT debut in Werther; Vyacheslav Polozov, the Russian tenor who sang in Puccini's La Boheme; and Ewa Podleś, the Polish contralto who sang in Verdi's A Masked Ball.  More recently, the acclaimed dramatic soprano Christine Goerke has performed in Fidelio (2013), Elektra (2014), Twilight: Gods (2020), and Cavalleria Rusticana (2021), with planned 2022 performances as Brünnhilde in The Valkyries and Aida In Concert alongside Angel Blue.

Premieres

World
Detroit Opera has staged the world premieres of the following operas:
Washington Square, composed by Thomas Pasatieri to a libretto by Kenward Elmslie after Henry James's novel, Washington Square. (October 1, 1976)
Singers / "What is there to sing about?" composed by Charles Strouse 1978
Margaret Garner, composed by Richard Danielpour to a libretto by Toni Morrison based on her novel Beloved. (May 7, 2005)
Cyrano composed by David DiChiera to a libretto by Bernard Uzan after Edmond Rostand's play Cyrano de Bergerac. (October 13, 2007)

North American
Detroit Opera staged these North American Premieres
 Anoush composed by Armen Tigranian Based on a Poem by Hovhannes Toumanian 1981
The Haunted Castle composed by Stanislow Moniuzko 1982

References
Notes

Sources
Bender, William (October 18, 1976). "Rite of Maturation". Time. Accessed 29 July 2008.
Bradsher, Keith (October 28, 1999). "A Horn of Plenty For Opera in Detroit: How to Thrive in a Blue-Collar City". The New York Times. Accessed 29 July 2008.
Holland, Bernard (May 9, 2005). "Giving New Voice to Former Slave's Tale of Sacrifice". The New York Times. Accessed 29 July 2008.
Anne Midgette, Anne (February 15, 2008). "Philadelphia's 'Cyrano': Actually, They Do Make 'Em Like That Anymore". The Washington Post.p. C04. Accessed 29 July 2008.
Detroit Opera House Opens with Pavarotti, Ludington Daily News. Associated Press. April 22, 1996. Accessed 25 April 2010.
Quinn, John & Donald V. Calamia (February 9, 2006). "Curtain Calls Online: News from the World of Professional Theatre: National Opera Associations Honors MOT with two awards". Between the Lines. Accessed May 4, 2010.
Clark, Alexandria. "Living Music: Interview Record". University of Michigan: School of Music & American Music Institute. Accessed May 10, 2010.

External links
 Detroit Opera's official site

Michigan Opera Theatre Performance Images at Wayne State University Library contains a digitized and searchable collection of forty years of photographs of performances at the Michigan Opera Theatre from 1964-2004.

American opera companies
Culture of Detroit
Musical groups established in 1970
Performing arts in Michigan
1970 establishments in Michigan